Ajit George is an Indian-American activist and game designer. He is the director of operations of Shanti Bhavan Children's Project, an international nonprofit organization based in Bangalore, India, that provides free education to socially disadvantaged children from the age of four until they graduate from college.

George is known in the gaming industry for his role as co-lead designer and author of the Dungeons & Dragons adventure anthology Journeys through the Radiant Citadel (2022) which was nominated for the Nebula Award for Best Game Writing. In 2022, George was awarded the Diana Jones Award, an annual award for "Excellence in Gaming".

Early years 
George, the oldest son of Mariam and Abraham M. George, grew up in New Jersey, United States.

Career

Education and Professional Life 
George is a board member of the Indian Institute of Journalism and New Media, a postgraduate school of journalism and media, founded in 2001 and based in Bangalore, India.

Shanti Bhavan Children's Project 
In 2008, George became the Director of Operations for Shanti Bhavan Children's Project. He was brought onto the team in response to the 2008 financial crisis to help Shanti Bhavan deal with its own financial crisis. George changed the financial structure of the organization, taking it from being funded privately to a 501(c)(3) nonprofit. It is now supported by individual donations, corporate and nongovernmental organization (NGO) partnerships, and grants.

As of 2022, George oversees all domestic and international fundraising, volunteer and teacher recruitment, media relations, strategic partnerships, and the mentorship program at Shanti Bhavan Children's Project. He commutes between the United States and India multiple times per year, spending three to four months at the school working with Shanti Bhavan students and the surrounding impoverished communities.

Writing and game design 
George is the creator, project co-lead, and writer for Journeys through the Radiant Citadel (2022), the “first anthology of D&D adventures to be written entirely by Black and brown authors". He was previously a contributing writer on another Dungeons & Dragons sourcebook, Van Richten's Guide to Ravenloft (2021).  The committee of the Diana Jones Award in 2022 highlighted that George "has been the first writer of Indian origin to write Indian-inspired material for a number of games, including Dungeons & Dragon's Van Richten’s Guide to Ravenloft". Journeys through the Radiant Citadel was nominated for the Nebula Award for Best Game Writing in March 2023.

George has also written for a variety of indie game companies including Bully Pulpit, Thorny Games,  and Monte Cook Games.

Along with being a writer, George is a diversity consultant, speaker, and activist in the gaming community. In 2016, George helped Gen Con expand its Industry Insider Speakers program. And in 2019, he created a POC training and mentorship program that connects game industry experts with POC professionals new to the industry. George also organized and led the first POC networking event at Big Bad Con in 2019.

Awards and nominations

Media 

 George and Shanti Bhavan Children's Project were featured in the 2017 original Netflix documentary series Daughters of Destiny: The Journey of Shanti Bhavan, written, directed, and co-produced by Vanessa Roth.
 George presented at TEDxUNC in 2014, and at TEDxCollegeofWilliam&Mary in 2016.
 George presented Nebula Awards' first-ever award for "Outstanding Game Writing" in 2019.

References 

Living people

American people of Indian descent
American video game designers
People from Morristown, New Jersey
Role-playing game designers
Year of birth missing (living people)